"Have a Look" is the debut single of Australian singer-songwriter Vanessa Amorosi, released in July 1999. The track was co-written by Amorosi with Australian Idol judge Mark Holden and Shaun Imrei, and it was produced by Steve Mac. The song reached  13 on the Australian Singles Chart and achieved gold status in seven weeks.

With a limited budget, its Australian video clip features Amorosi travelling around the Sydney train network and walking around Bondi Junction and Liverpool plaza shopping complex. "Have a Look" was later included on Amorosi's debut album, The Power, in 2000 and was released as the album's third European single the following year, reaching the top 75 in Germany and Switzerland.

Track listings
Australian CD single
 "Have a Look" (radio mix) – 3:34
 "Have a Look" (extended mix) – 4:55
 "Have a Look" (instrumental) – 3:30

European CD single
 "Have a Look" (7th District radio edit) – 3:47
 "Have a Look" (album version) – 3:34

European maxi-CD single
 "Have a Look" (7th District radio edit) – 3:47
 "Have a Look" (album version) – 3:34
 "Heroes Live Forever" – 4:31
 "Rise Up" – 3:36
 A limited-edition version of this maxi-single also contains a video of an acoustic version of "Have a Look" recorded live at MTV.

Charts

Weekly chart

Year-end charts

Certifications

Release history

References

Vanessa Amorosi songs
1999 debut singles
1999 songs
Song recordings produced by Steve Mac
Songs written by Mark Holden
Songs written by Vanessa Amorosi